Lovers Rock is the eighth studio album by Canadian indie rock band The Dears. It was released on May 15, 2020 under Dangerbird Records.

The first single from the album, "The Worst in Us", was released on March 13, 2020. The second single "I Know What You're Thinking And It's Awful" was released on May 1, 2020.

Critical reception
Lovers Rock was met with generally favorable reviews from critics. At Metacritic, which assigns a weighted average rating out of 100 to reviews from mainstream publications, this release received an average score of 63, based on 7 reviews.

Track listing

References

2020 albums
The Dears albums
Dangerbird Records albums